Arthur Kenneth Gibson (19 May 1889 – 28 January 1950) was a Royal Navy officer who also played first-class cricket for Navy sides and in one match for Somerset. He was born at Kensington, London, and died at Edinburgh, Scotland.

Cricket career
Gibson was an opening or middle-order batsman and an occasional bowler in his first-class matches. He played Minor Counties cricket for Hertfordshire in 1911 and 1912 and made his first-class debut for a Royal Navy team against the Army team in an inter-services match, then considered first-class, in 1914. His one game for Somerset, for whom his qualification is doubtful, was another services match against the strong Australian Imperial Forces side that played several first-class matches in the 1919 season; Gibson top-scored in a poor Somerset first innings with 22, and in the second innings was one of Herbie Collins' eight victims, the Australian batsman's best-ever return as a bowler. He played further single games for the Royal Navy side against the Army in 1920 and 1924.

Naval career
Gibson was educated at the Britannia Royal Naval College, Dartmouth. He served throughout the First World War on torpedo boats, and commanded torpedo operations on the destroyers HMS Crane, HMS Myrmidon, HMS Acheron and HMS Rattlesnake. He retired from the Navy with rank of commander in 1935.

References

1889 births
1950 deaths
English cricketers
Hertfordshire cricketers
Somerset cricketers
Royal Navy cricketers
Army and Navy cricketers
Royal Navy officers of World War I
Military personnel from London
Graduates of Britannia Royal Naval College
People from Kensington
Royal Navy officers